Sōgen, Sogen or Sougen (written: 宗現, 宗源 or 曹玄) is a masculine Japanese given name. Notable people with the name include:

, Japanese Zen Buddhist

, Japanese Zen Buddhist

Japanese masculine given names